Brillantissime  is a French comedy film directed by Michèle Laroque and based on the play My Brilliant Divorce by Geraldine Aron. It was released in France on 17 January 2018.

Cast

Production
The film was produced thanks to donations on touscoprod.com. The shooting of the film began on March 20 and ended in May 2017 in Nice.

References

External links
 
 

2018 films
2018 comedy films
French comedy films
2010s French-language films
2010s French films